The Old Rectory (also known as Parsonage Court) is a ruin of a former rectory in the village of Warton, near Lancaster, Lancashire, England. Owned by English Heritage, it has been designated a Scheduled Ancient Monument and Grade I listed building.

The rectory is believed to have been built in the early 14th century as the residence of the rector of the parish of St Oswald's, Warton, probably by two younger sons of Marmaduke, Lord Thweng. Manorial courts were also held here. The walls are of limestone rubble with sandstone dressings, and a cross passage originally separated the full-height great hall on the southern side from service rooms and a first floor chamber at the other end of the house. The doorway at the eastern end of the cross passage is interpreted as the main entrance, while the western one led into a garden, and both originally had a porch. A doorway in the northern gable wall led into a courtyard with an external kitchen and a well. In the south-west corner of the great hall is a doorway that led to another building which survives as part of the modern vicarage. The southern gable had an ogee quatrefoiled window under the apex to provide light.

It is not known exactly when the rectory was abandoned, after being replaced by a new rectory, but it was a ruin by 1721. Some time later, a cottage was constructed in the north end of the ruin, which was occupied well into the 20th century, however these additions have since been removed. The ruin is considered to be well preserved, with the gables surviving to almost their full height. It is open to visitors, free of charge.

Media galley

See also

Grade I listed buildings in Lancashire
Scheduled monuments in Lancashire
Listed buildings in Warton, Lancaster

References

Footnotes

External links

 English Heritage Properties (Visitor Information)
 Lancashire County Council - Archaeology & Heritage

Grade I listed buildings in Lancashire
Scheduled monuments in Lancashire
Buildings and structures in the City of Lancaster
English Heritage sites in Lancashire
Ruins in Lancashire
Clergy houses in England
Grade I listed houses